Sophie Ferguson (born 19 March 1986) is a former professional Australian tennis player.

She won nine titles on the ITF Women's Circuit (six in doubles) and played on the WTA Tour. She reached a career-high singles ranking of world No. 109 on 19 July 2010, and  best ranking in doubles of No. 148 on 8 October 2007. She retired from tour in 2012.

Ferguson has undergone coaching from Australian Tony Roche.

Career
In 2005, Ferguson got entry in the 2005 Australian Open as a wildcard. She defeated Nuria Llagostera Vives in the first round, before falling to Nadia Petrova in the second.

At the 2007 Australian Open, she defeated former world No. 8, Ai Sugiyama.
She received a wildcard to play in the 2007 Indian Open but lost in the first round against Jelena Kostanić Tošić.

She played at the 2009 Korea Open, and won through qualifying, before losing to former champion Maria Kirilenko.

In 2010, Ferguson got entry in the French Open as a qualifier. In the first round, she defeated Petra Kvitová, before losing in the second to eventual champion, Francesca Schiavone.

ITF Circuit finals

Singles (3–9)

Doubles (6–7)

References

External links
 
 
 

Australian female tennis players
Sportswomen from New South Wales
1986 births
Living people
Tennis players from Sydney
People educated at Pymble Ladies' College
21st-century Australian women